Michal Finger (born 2 September 1993) is a Czech professional volleyball player. He is part of the Czech national team.

Sporting achievements

Clubs
 National championships
 2014/2015  German Cup, with VfB Friedrichshafen
 2014/2015  German Championship, with VfB Friedrichshafen
 2016/2017  German SuperCup, with VfB Friedrichshafen
 2016/2017  German Cup, with VfB Friedrichshafen

Individual awards
 2013: European League – Best Spiker
 2017: German Cup – Most Valuable Player
 2018: European League – Best Opposite

References

External links

 
 Player profile at LegaVolley.it 
 Player profile at Volleybox.net

1993 births
Living people
Czech men's volleyball players
Sportspeople from Prague
Czech expatriate sportspeople in Germany
Expatriate volleyball players in Germany
Czech expatriate sportspeople in Italy
Expatriate volleyball players in Italy
Czech expatriate sportspeople in Turkey
Expatriate volleyball players in Turkey
Czech expatriate sportspeople in Greece
Expatriate volleyball players in Greece
Czech expatriate sportspeople in Qatar
Expatriate volleyball players in Qatar
Opposite hitters